Ben McFadgean (born 31 July 1986) is a former professional rugby league footballer who played on the  for the Penrith Panthers in the NRL.

Background
McFadgean was born Windsor, New South Wales, Australia.

Playing career
McFadgean played his first and only game on round 18 in 2009.

He played for the New South Wales Residents team in 2009.

Other than the one first grade game, he played for Windsor Wolves in the NSWRL Jim Beam Cup.

References

1986 births
Living people
Australian rugby league players
Penrith Panthers players
Rugby league wingers
Rugby league players from Windsor, New South Wales
Windsor Wolves players